Atma Tarang is a 1937 Hindi social drama film directed by Sohrab Modi. This film and Khan Bahadur, made the same year, were the first films produced under Modi's newly established banner, Minerva Movietone (1936). The music was composed by Habib Khan, with art direction by Rusi K. Banker. 
The film starred the singer-actor Feroz Dastur in the role of Mohan, with Sohrab Modi, Prabha, and Vasant Pahelwan. C. Ramchandra, the famous music composer was a harmonium accompanist for Minerva Movietone music directors like Habib Khan and Bindu Khan. He also acted in a small role in Atma Tarang and in the earlier Said-e-Havas (1936).

The story involved the topic of Brahmacharya, which was Modi's preference for his first film under the Minerva banner, as he was influenced at that time by his interest in the Ramakrishna Mission.

Cast
 Sohrab Modi
 Prabha
 Feroze Dastur
 Vasant Pahelwan
 Eruch Tarapore
 Gulzar
 S. L. Puri

Box office
According to Modi in a 1988 Films Division of India biographical film- Sohrab Modi by Yash Chaudhary, Atma Tarang was the biggest flop he ever made. Modi stated that while waiting in the Minerva Theatre (where the film was released), Bombay, he observed there were hardly 20-30 people in the audience. Four men approached him and congratulated a by-then dejected Modi, and told him to continue making good films like Atma Tarang and he would reach the top one day. He later found out that the four men were judges of the Bombay High Court.

Soundtrack
The music director was Habib Khan.

Song list

References

External links

1937 films
1930s Hindi-language films
1937 drama films
Indian drama films
Films directed by Sohrab Modi
Indian black-and-white films
Hindi-language drama films